The Iran–Israel proxy conflict, also known as the Iran–Israel proxy war or Iran–Israel Cold War, is an ongoing proxy war between Iran and Israel. The conflict involves threats and hostility by Iran's leaders against Israel, and their declared objective to dissolve the Jewish state on the basis of, or not on the basis of anti-semitic rhetoric and reasoning.

Iran has provided funding, weapons, and training to groups including Lebanese Hezbollah, and Palestinian Islamic Jihad (PIJ), which have vowed and carried out attacks on Israel, and which have been designated terrorist organisations by many countries. Because of the hostility, Israel is concerned by Iran's nuclear weapons program and missile program, and is seeking to downgrade Iran's allies and proxies, as well as preventing Iranian entrenchment in Syria, another sworn enemy of Israel.

Iran's hostility towards Israel followed the 1979 Iranian Revolution, and expanded into covert Iranian support of Hezbollah during the South Lebanon conflict (1985–2000) and by 2005 developed into a proxy regional conflict. In 2006, Iran was actively involved in supporting Hezbollah during the 2006 Lebanon War and in parallel began supporting Hamas and Palestinian Islamic Jihad (PIJ), especially in the Gaza Strip. Israel, on the other hand, initiated a campaign to harm the Iranian nuclear program, utilizing several anti-regime militias within Iran. Upon the onset of the Syrian Civil War, the conflict escalated and by 2018 turned into direct Iranian-Israeli warfare.

Israel, in turn, opposes Iran's nuclear program, and maintains ties with other rivals of Iran such as Saudi Arabia and the United States. The involvement of Iran and Israel in the Syrian Civil War creates the possibility of direct conflict between the two countries. Israel has supported and conducted assassinations and attacks against Iranian targets directly. Israel has also conducted cyber warfare against Iran, and has publicly advocated for international military action against Iran.

Israel has accused Iran of attempting to form a continuous land transport route from Iran via Iraq and Syria into Lebanon, which Israel views as a significant strategic threat. Iranian leaders have described Israel as an illegitimate "Zionist regime" and have accused Israel of being an American client state hostile to Muslims.

Iranian dissidents, protestors, and opposition parties are frequently imagined and attacked as members of "Israel's army" or as agents of the pejorative "Zionist entity".

Background

Ruhollah Khomeini was critical of Israel before he became Iran's Supreme Leader in 1979. He criticized the Pahlavi dynasty Iran's ties with Israel, viewing Israel as a supporter of the Pahlavi regime. Following the 1979 Iranian Revolution, Khomeini's new government adopted a policy of hostility towards Israel. Iran withdrew recognition of Israel as a state, and severed all diplomatic, commercial and other ties with Israel, referring to its government as the "Zionist regime" and Israel as "occupied Palestine".

Despite the tension between the two countries, Israel provided support to Iran during the Iran–Iraq War from 1980 to 1988. During the 8 years war, Israel was one of the main suppliers of military equipment to Iran. Israel also provided military instructors during the war and direct support to Iran's war effort, when it bombed and destroyed Iraq's Osirak nuclear reactor, during Operation Babylon. The nuclear reactor was considered a central component of Iraq's nuclear weapons program.

The 1982 Israeli invasion of Lebanon resulted in the Palestine Liberation Organization's (PLO) departure from Lebanon. The following creation of Security Zone in South Lebanon has benefited Israeli allies in Lebanon and civilian Israeli population, as Galilee suffered less violent attacks by Hezbollah, than previously by PLO in the 1970s (hundreds of Israeli civilian casualties). Despite this Israeli success in eradicating PLO bases and partial withdraw in 1985, the Israeli invasion had actually increased the severity of conflict with local Lebanese militias and resulted in the consolidation of several local Shia Muslim movements in Lebanon, including Hezbollah and Amal, from a previously unorganized guerrilla movement in the south. Over the years, military casualties of both sides grew higher, as both parties used more modern weaponry, and Hezbollah progressed in its tactics.

Iran supplied the militant organization Hezbollah with substantial amounts of financial, training, weapons, explosives, political, diplomatic, and organizational aid while persuading Hezbollah to take an action against Israel. Hezbollah's 1985 manifesto listed its four main goals as "Israel's final departure from Lebanon as a prelude to its final obliteration" According to reports released in February 2010, Hezbollah received $400 million from Iran. By the early 1990s, Hezbollah, with support from Syria and Iran, emerged as the leading group and military power, monopolizing the directorship of the guerrilla activity in South Lebanon.

In January 2014, Israeli Prime Minister Benjamin Netanyahu warned that Iran's nuclear program would only be set back six weeks as a result of its interim agreement with the international community. 
In one of the region's oddest pairings, Israel and the Gulf Arab states led by Saudi Arabia increasingly are finding common ground — and a common political language — on their mutual dismay over the prospect of a nuclear deal in Geneva that could curb Tehran's atomic program but leave the main elements intact, such as uranium enrichment. In June 2017, former Israeli Defense Minister Moshe Ya'alon stated that "We and the Arabs, the same Arabs who organized in a coalition in the Six-Day War to try to destroy the Jewish state, today find themselves in the same boat with us ... The Sunni Arab countries, apart from Qatar, are largely in the same boat with us since we all see a nuclear Iran as the number one threat against all of us".

History

2000s
With the election of Iranian hardliner Mahmoud Ahmadinejad in 2005, relations between Iran and Israel became increasingly tense as the countries engaged in a series of proxy conflicts and covert operations against each other.

During the 2006 Lebanon War, Iranian Revolutionary Guards were believed to have directly assisted Hezbollah fighters in their attacks on Israel. Multiple sources suggested that hundreds of Revolutionary Guard operatives participated in the firing of rockets into Israel during the war, and secured Hezbollah's long-range missiles. Revolutionary Guard operatives were allegedly seen operating openly at Hezbollah outposts during the war. In addition, Revolutionary Guard operatives were alleged to have supervised Hezbollah's attack on the INS Hanit with a C-802 anti-ship missile. The attack severely damaged the warship and killed four crewmen. It is alleged that between six and nine Revolutionary Guard operatives were killed by the Israeli military during the war According to the Israeli media their bodies were transferred to Syria and from there, flown to Tehran. On 6 September 2007, the  Israeli Air Force destroyed a suspected nuclear reactor in Syria, with ten North Koreans reportedly killed.

During and immediately after the Gaza War, the Israeli Air Force, with the assistance of Israeli commandos, was reported to have allegedly carried out three airstrikes against Iranian arms being smuggled to Hamas through Sudan, as Iran launched an intensive effort to supply Hamas with weapons and ammunition. Israel hinted that it was behind the attacks. Two truck convoys were destroyed, and an arms-laden ship was sunk in the Red Sea.

On 4 November 2009, Israel captured a ship in the eastern Mediterranean Sea and its cargo of hundreds of tons of weapons allegedly bound from Iran to Hezbollah.

2010
In 2010, a wave of assassinations targeting Iranian nuclear scientists began. The assassinations were widely believed to be the work of Mossad, Israel's foreign intelligence service. According to Iran and global media sources, the methods used to kill the scientists is reminiscent of the way Mossad had previously assassinated targets. The assassinations were alleged to be an attempt to stop Iran's nuclear program, or to ensure that it cannot recover following a strike on Iranian nuclear facilities. In the first attack, particle physicist Masoud Alimohammadi was killed on 12 January 2010 when a booby-trapped motorcycle parked near his car exploded. On 12 October 2010, an explosion occurred at an IRGC military base near the city of Khorramabad, killing 18 soldiers. On 29 November 2010, two senior Iranian nuclear scientists, Majid Shahriari and Fereydoon Abbasi, were targeted by hitmen on motorcycles, who attached bombs to their cars and detonated them from a distance. Shahriari was killed, while Abbasi was severely wounded. On 23 July 2011, Darioush Rezaeinejad was shot dead in eastern Tehran. On 11 January 2012, Mostafa Ahmadi Roshan and his driver were killed by a bomb attached to their car from a motorcycle.

In June 2010 Stuxnet, an advanced computer worm was discovered. It is believed that it had been developed by US and Israel to attack Iran's nuclear facilities. In a study conducted by ISIS it is estimated that Stuxnet might have damaged as many as 1,000 centrifuges (10% of all installed) in the Natanz enrichment plant. Other computer viruses and malware, including Duqu and Flame, were reportedly related to Stuxnet. Iran claims that its adversaries regularly engineer sales of faulty equipment and attacks by computer viruses to sabotage its nuclear program.

2011
On 15 March 2011, Israel seized a ship from Syria bringing Iranian weapons to Gaza. In addition, the Mossad was also suspected of being responsible for an explosion that reportedly damaged the nuclear facility at Isfahan. Iran denied that any explosion had occurred, but The Times reported damage to the nuclear plant based on satellite images, and quoted Israeli intelligence sources as saying that the blast indeed targeted a nuclear site, and was "no accident". Hours after the blast took place, Hezbollah fired two rockets into northern Israel. The Israel Defense Forces reacted by firing four artillery shells at the area from where the launch originated. It was speculated that the attack was ordered by Iran and Syria as a warning to Israel. The Israeli attack was reported to have killed 7 people, including foreign nationals. Another 12 people were injured, of whom 7 later died in hospital.

The Mossad was suspected of being behind an explosion at a Revolutionary Guard missile base in November 2011. The blast killed 17 Revolutionary Guard operatives, including General Hassan Moqaddam, described as a key figure in Iran's missile program. Israeli journalist Ron Ben-Yishai wrote that several lower-ranked Iranian missile experts had probably been previously killed in several explosions at various sites.

In response to Israeli covert operations, Iranian agents reportedly began trying to hit Israeli and Jewish targets; potential targets were then placed on high alert. Yoram Cohen, the head of Shin Bet, claimed that three planned attacks in Turkey, Azerbaijan and Thailand were thwarted at the last minute. On 11 October 2011, the United States claimed to have foiled an alleged Iranian plot that included bombing the Israeli and Saudi embassies in Washington DC and Buenos Aires.

2012
On 13 February 2012, Israeli embassy staff in Georgia and India were targeted. In Georgia, a car bomb failed to explode near the embassy and was safely detonated by Georgian police. In India, the car bomb exploded, injuring four people. Amongst the wounded was the wife of an Israeli Defense Ministry employee. Israel accused Iran of being behind the attacks. The following day, three alleged Iranian agents were uncovered in Bangkok, Thailand, thought to have been planning to kill Israeli diplomatic officials, including the ambassador, by attaching bombs to embassy cars. The cell was uncovered when one of their bombs exploded. Police responded, and the Iranian agent present at the house threw an explosive device at officers that tore his legs off, and was subsequently taken into custody. A second suspect was arrested as he tried to catch a flight out of the country, and the third escaped to Malaysia, where he was arrested by Royal Malaysian Police. Thai police subsequently arrested two people suspected of involvement. Indian police arrested a Delhi-based journalist in connection with February's car bomb, which injured four Israelis including the wife of an Israeli diplomat. Syed Mohammed Kazmi the journalist was arrested on 6 March 2012, he is said to have been in contact with a suspect police believe might have stuck a magnetic bomb to the diplomat's car. It is said Kazmi was an Indian citizen who worked for an Iranian publication.

In late February 2012, WikiLeaks published confidential emails from Stratfor, a US-based private intelligence company, which were stolen by the hacking group Anonymous. Among the information released was a claim that Israeli commandos, in collaboration with Kurdish fighters, destroyed several underground Iranian facilities used for nuclear and defense research projects.

On 18 July 2012, a bus carrying Israeli tourists in Bulgaria was destroyed in a bombing attack that killed five Israeli tourists and the Bulgarian driver, and injured 32 people. Israeli Prime Minister Benjamin Netanyahu blamed Iran and Hezbollah for the attack. In July 2012, a senior Israeli defense official stated that since May 2011, more than 20 terrorist attacks planned by Iranians or suspected Hezbollah agents against Israeli targets worldwide had been foiled, including in South Africa, Azerbaijan, Kenya, Turkey, Thailand, Cyprus, Bulgaria, Nepal, Nigeria, and Peru, and that Iranian and Hezbollah operatives were incarcerated in jails throughout the world.

On 6 October 2012, Israeli airplanes shot down a small UAV as it flew over northern Negev. Hezbollah confirmed it sent the drone and Nasrallah said in a televised speech that the drone's parts were manufactured in Iran.

On 24 October 2012, Sudan claimed that Israel had bombed a munitions factory, allegedly belonging to Iran's Revolutionary Guard, south of Khartoum.

In November 2012, Israel reported that an Iranian ship was being loaded with rockets to be exported to countries within range of Israel and that Israel "will attack and destroy any shipment of arms".

2013
In January 2013, rumors were released that the Fordow Fuel Enrichment Plant had been hit by an explosion. Further reports by IAEA concluded that there had been no such incident.

On 25 April 2013, Israeli aircraft shot down a drone off the coast of Haifa, allegedly belonging to Hezbollah.

On 7 May 2013, residents of Tehran reported hearing three blasts in an area where Iran maintains its missile research and depots. Later, an Iranian website said the blasts occurred at a privately owned chemical factory.

On 10 December, Hamas announced that they have resumed ties with Iran after a brief cut off over the Syrian conflict

2014
A court in Jerusalem has sentenced an Israeli man, Yitzhak Bergel to four-and-a-half years in prison for offering to spy for Iran. Bergel belongs to the anti-Zionist Neturei Karta, an ultra-Orthodox Jewish sect which is vehemently opposed to the State of Israel's existence.

On 5 March 2014, the Israeli navy intercepted the Klos-C cargo ship. Israel stated Iran was using the vessel to smuggle dozens of long-range rockets to Gaza, including Syrian-manufactured M-302 rockets. The operation, named Full Disclosure and carried out by Shayetet 13 special forces, took place in the Red Sea, 1,500 kilometers away from Israel and some 160 kilometers from Port Sudan.

Iranian state media reported that on 24 August 2014, IRGC had shot down an Israeli drone near Natanz fuel enrichment plant. Israeli military did not comment on the reports.

Two workers were killed in an explosion that took place at a military explosives factory southeast of Tehran, near the suspected nuclear reactor in Parchin. In what seemed to be a response ordered by Iran, Hezbollah set off an explosive device on the border between Lebanon and the Israeli-controlled side of the Shebaa farms, wounding two Israeli soldiers. Israel responded with artillery fire toward two Hezbollah positions in southern Lebanon.

During the Syrian civil war 

Israel and Syria have observed a truce since Israel reaffirmed its control over most of the Golan Heights in the 1973 Yom Kippur War, but the Syrian Civil War, which began in 2011, has led to several incidents of fire exchange across the once-peaceful borders. The Israeli military is reportedly preparing itself for potential threats should there be a power vacuum in Syria. "After Assad and after establishing or strengthening their foothold in Syria, they are going to move and deflect their effort and attack Israel," an Israeli official told The Associated Press in January 2014. Some experts say that while the encroaching militant forces on Israel's border will heighten security measures, the advancements are not likely to create significant changes to Israel's policy disengagement in the Syria crisis.

In the Syrian Civil War, hoping to bolster its logistics and force projection capabilities in the area, Tehran aims to clear a path from the Iranian capital to Damascus and the Mediterranean coast. Israeli government is convinced that Iran is interested in creating territorial contiguity from Iran to the Mediterranean and in transferring military forces – including naval vessels, fighter planes and thousands of troops – to permanent bases in Syria and is trying to "Lebanonize" Syria and take over using Shi'ite militias, as it had done with Hezbollah in Lebanon. As Israeli Defence Minister Avigdor Lieberman has warned, "everything possible will be done to prevent the existence of a Shi'ite corridor from Tehran to Damascus". In 2017, Israeli intelligence discovered an Iranian base being built in Syria just 50 km from the Israeli border.

Covert operations (2013–2017)
On several occasions between 2013 and 2017 Israel reportedly carried out or supported attacks on Hezbollah and Iranian targets within Syrian territories or Lebanon. One of the first reliably reported incidents took place on 30 January 2013, when Israeli aircraft struck a Syrian convoy allegedly transporting Iranian weapons to Hezbollah. Habitually, Israel refused to comment on the incident, a stance that is believed to seek to ensure that the Syrian government did not feel obliged to retaliate.

More incidents were attributed to IAF on May 2013, December 2014 and April 2015. Some of those reports  were confirmed by the Syrian Arab Republic, whereas others were denied. Israel systematically refused to comment on alleged targeting of Hezbollah and Ba'athist Syrian targets in Syrian territory. In 2015, suspected Hezbollah militants launched a retaliatory attack on Israeli forces in Shebaa farms as a response to an Israeli airstrike in the Syrian Golan that killed Hezbollah and IRGC senior operatives. In March 2017, Syria launched anti-aircraft missiles towards the Israeli-controlled part of the Golan Heights, allegedly targeting Israeli IAF aircraft, which Syria claimed were on their way to attack targets in Palmyra in Syria. After the incident, the State of Israel stated it was targeting weapons shipments headed toward anti-Israeli forces, specifically Hezbollah, located in Lebanon. Israel denied Syria's claim that one jet fighter was shot down and another damaged. Israel has not reported any pilots or aircraft missing in Syria, or anywhere else in the Middle East following the incident. According to some sources, the incident was the first time Israeli officials clearly confirmed an Israeli strike on a Hezbollah convoy during the Syrian Civil War. As of September 2017, this was the only time such confirmation was issued.

Open engagement (2017–2018)
Beginning in January 2017, the Israeli Air Force began flying almost daily attack missions against Iranian targets in Syria, dropping about 2,000 bombs in 2018 alone. Some Iranian targets were also attacked by Israeli surface-to-surface missiles or in raids by Israeli special forces. According to former IDF Chief of Staff Gadi Eizenkot, the decision to strike Iranian bases in Syria was made after Iran changed its strategy in 2016 as the US-led military intervention against ISIL was drawing to an end, planning to exploit the power vacuum to establish hegemony in Syria, building bases and bringing in foreign Shiite fighters. Although the full extent of the campaign would not be revealed until 2019, by early December 2017 the Israeli Air Force confirmed it had attacked arms convoys of Ba'athist Syria and Lebanon's Hezbollah nearly 100 times during more than six years of the conflict in Syria. In January 2019, outgoing IDF Chief of Staff Gadi Eizenkot claimed that up to that point, only a few dozen Iranian military personnel had been killed in the attacks, as Israel had taken care to primarily target Iranian infrastructure while sparing personnel so as not to give Iran any pretext to retaliate.

Heist of Iranian nuclear secrets in 2018
It was reported that the Mossad stole nuclear secrets from a secure warehouse in Tehran in January 2018. According to reports, the agents came in a truck semitrailer at midnight, cut into dozens of safes with "high intensity torches", and carted out "50,000 pages and 163 compact discs of memos, videos and plans" before leaving in time to make their escape when the guards came for the morning shift at 7 am. According to the Israelis, the documents and files (which it shared with European countries and the United States), demonstrated that the Iranian AMAD Project aimed to develop nuclear weapons, that Iran had a nuclear program when it claimed to have "largely suspended it", and that there were two nuclear sites in Iran that had been hidden from inspectors. This was followed by the Trump administration withdrawing the United States from the JCPOA and reimposing US sanctions on Iran. Shortly after retiring as head of Mossad, Yossi Cohen admitted he oversaw the operation to steal the Iranian documents during a televised interview in June 2021.  Benjamin Netanyahu's 2022 book revealed several new details of the operation, including an intent to sabotage the nuclear program by stealing irreplaceable documents, in addition to proving its mere existence.

Syria, Iraq and Lebanon (2019–2020)

In July 2019, it was reported that Israel had expanded its strikes against Iranian missile shipments to Iraq, with Israeli F-35 combat planes allegedly striking Iranian targets in Iraq twice.
Israeli airstrikes reportedly targeted Iran-backed militias in Iraq during 2019.

On September 16, 2019, air strikes, targeting three positions of the Iranian Revolutionary Guards and allied Iraqi militias, killed at least 10 pro-Iranian militiamen in Albu Kamal, Syria. The strikes were allegedly blamed on Israel. According to the time, the increase of Iran-Israel tension concurs with discussion of a possible rapprochement between Iran and the U.S.

Israeli aircraft or drones attacked a Popular Front for the Liberation of Palestine (PFLP) position in Qousaya, located in the Beqaa Valley of Lebanon, close to the border with Syria on Sunday night, 26 August 2019, according to Lebanese media reports. The attack came a day after two drones exploded in the Lebanese capital Beirut.

According to an official from the Palestinian position in the town three air strikes hit the PFLP-GC military position in Quasaya early morning 26 August 2019 causing only material damage.

In the first half of 2020, Israel continued to target Iranian weapon depots in Syria.

On 27 July 2020, explosions and exchange of fire were heard during a "security incident" at the border between the Israeli-occupied Golan Heights and Lebanon. The incident involved Israeli soldiers and four Hezbollah fighters who allegedly crossed the border, and came days after a Hezbollah member was killed by Israeli airstrikes in Syria and an Israeli drone crashed in Lebanon. The Israel Defense Forces said that there were no Israeli casualties and that the four Hezbollah fighters fled back to Lebanon after being shot at. However, Hezbollah denied that their forces attacked the Israeli army, and said that their fighters had not crossed the border in a released statement. The group said that Israel opened fire first. Two dozen explosions were heard in Lebanon; an Israeli shell smashed in a civilian home, narrowly missing a family in the house at the time, but nobody was hurt.

Assassinations, Cyberwarfare, and sabotage in 2020

The US assassinated Qasem Soleimani on 3rd of January, reversing policy of the prior administration which had warned Iran of Israeli attempts at assassinating Soleimani.  The Iranians retailiated with Operation Martyr Soleimani, during which the IRGC mistakenly shot down Ukraine International Airlines Flight 752, killing all 176 passengers and crew aboard, including 82 Iranian citizens.  This triggered another wave of Iranian anti-government protests (part of the larger 2019–2020 Iranian protests), with many Iranians calling for the removal of Supreme Leader Ali Khamenei.  When giant U.S. and Israeli flags were painted on the ground for crowds of Iranian protestors to trample on them, according to video filmed at the scene that has been verified by NBC News, the crowds of people outside Beheshti University refused to trample over them.

On May 9, 2020, Israel was reportedly behind a cyberattack that disrupted the Shahid Rajaee port in the Strait of Hormuz, causing traffic jams of delivery trucks and delays in shipments. It was suggested the attack was a response to a failed Iranian cyberattack on an Israeli water facility of the Sharon central region in April.

In June and July, a series of explosions targeted Iran's nuclear and missile programs and various other infrastructure. There were accidents and damages reported in the Parchin military complex near Tehran on 26 June, the Sina At'har clinic in northern Tehran on 30 June, the Natanz nuclear facility on 2 July, the Shahid Medhaj power plant (Zargan) in Ahvaz and the Karun petrochemical center in the city of Mahshahr on 4 July. It has been speculated that Israel was involved, and the damage at the centrifuge plant in Natanz alone could delay the Iranian nuclear weapons program by one or two years, according to intelligence officials. On July 6, another explosion occurred at the Sepahan Boresh factory in the city of Baqershahr. On July 9, explosions were reported at a missile depot belonging to Iran's Revolutionary Guards Corps west of Tehran. On July 11, an explosion took place at the basement of an old two-story house containing gas cylinders in northern Tehran. On July 12, a fire broke out at the Shahid Tondgooyan Petrochemical Company in southwest Iran. On July 13, an explosion occurred at a gas condensate plant of the Kavian Fariman industrial zone in the Razavi Khorasan Province. On July 15, a large fire broke out at a shipyard in the city of Bushehr, spreading to seven wooden boats. On July 18, an oil pipeline exploded in the Ahvaz region in southern Iran. On July 19, another explosion took place in a power station in Isfahan. Later in the day, a large fire was registered at a cellophane or yarn factory near the city of Tabriz in northwest Iran.

Mohsen Fakhrizadeh, head of Iran's nuclear weapons program, was assassinated on 27 November 2020 in Absard.

Attacks on ships and incidents in 2021
Israeli commandos carried out attacks which damaged numerous Iranian cargo ships carrying oil and weapons to Syria from late 2019 to 2021. Israeli-owned ships were attacked in the Gulf of Oman and the Arabian Sea, allegedly by Iran. Israel was also reportedly behind an attack on an Iranian intelligence ship of the Islamic Revolutionary Guard Corps Navy in the Red Sea, which was heavily damaged by a limpet mine in April 2021.

On 10 April 2021, Iran began injecting uranium hexafluoride gas into advanced IR-6 and IR- 5 centrifuges at Natanz, but an accident occurred in the electricity distribution network the next day due to Mossad activity, according to Western and Iranian sources. In what seemed to be an Iranian response, an Israeli-owned ship was attacked by a missile or a drone near the shores of the Fujairah emirate in the United Arab Emirates on April 13, causing light damage to the vessel. On 24 April, an Iranian fuel tanker was reportedly attacked off the Syrian coast by an Israeli drone, causing damages but no casualties. On May 7, a massive fire broke out in Iran's southwestern city of Bushehr near the only functioning nuclear power plant of the country. The IRGC-affiliated Tasnim News Agency reported that the fire was intentional, although its cause was unknown. On May 9, an explosion occurred at an oil tanker off the coast of Syria, causing a small fire in one of its engines. On May 23, at least nine people were injured in a blast at an Iranian plant that reportedly produces UAVs in Isfahan. The blast occurred after Prime Minister Netanyahu said a drone armed with explosives that was downed by Israeli forces earlier in the week was launched by Iran toward Israel from either Syria or Iraq, amid the fighting in Gaza. On May 26, an explosion took place at a petrochemical complex in the city of Asaluyeh in southern Iran, killing a worker and injuring two. On June 2, a fire broke out at an Iranian navy vessel, the IRIS Kharg, near the port of Jask in the Gulf of Oman, although the entire crew was able to safely disembark before the ship sank. Later in the day there was a gas leak at an oil refinery in Tehran which caused a massive fire. No injuries were reported. An explosion took place at the Zarand Iranian Steel Company in eastern Iran on June 5. No injuries were reported. On June 20, it was reported that Iran's sole nuclear power plant at Bushehr underwent an emergency shutdown that would last between three and four days. On June 23, a major damage was caused to one of the buildings of Iran's Atomic Energy Organization, although Iranian authorities denied there was any damage or casualties as a result of the sabotage attempt. On July 3, an Israeli-owned cargo ship was struck by an "unknown weapon" in the northern Indian Ocean, causing a fire to erupt onboard the vessel, although no injuries were reported. Israeli sources suspect that Iran was behind the attack. On July 5, a large fire was reported at a warehouse or factory near the city of Karaj, where an alleged previous attack targeted a nuclear facility reportedly used to produce centrifuges. Iranian media reported an explosion on 14 July at an office building in western Tehran, causing heavy damage to part of the building. On 29 July, an Israeli-operated oil tanker was attacked near the coast of Oman. According to senior Israeli officials, the attack was conducted by Iran. On 10 August, a major explosion took place on a commercial ship docked at the Latakia port in Syria. Some reports identified the targeted ship as Iranian. The same day a fire broke out at an Iranian petrochemical factory on Khark Island in the Persian Gulf. On 26 September, three people were injured in a fire at an IRGC research center west of Tehran. On October 26, a cyberattack crippled gas stations across Iran. It was reported that some hacked systems displayed messages addressing Iranian Supreme Leader Ali Khamenei, demanding to know "where is the gas." On November 7, it was reported that Mossad thwarted multiple Iranian attacks on Israelis in Tanzania, Senegal and Ghana. African authorities arrested five suspects. Iran has also attempted to strike Israel overseas and using cyberattacks. On November 17, Iranian media reported an explosion at an oil pipeline in the south of the country.
In March 2022 Reuters reported that Israel was carrying out airstrikes against Iranian personnel and militias in Syria backed by Iran. The report said that Israel "seeks to prevent Iran from transferring weapons to Hezbollah".

Assasinations and hits on Iranian military installations in 2022
In February 2022, an Israeli attack against an Iranian base destroyed hundrends of drones, which prompted Iran to fire missiles on an American consulate in Ibril (Iraqi Kurdistan) the following month. An Iranian cyberattack on Israeli websites was also reported.

On May 22, Col. Hassan Sayyad Khodaei, a senior member of Iran's Islamic Revolutionary Guard Corps, was shot dead in his car in Tehran. He was among those responsible within the Guard's elite​ Quds Force for carrying out Iranian operations in Iraq and Syria. On May 25, an engineer was killed and another employee was wounded during an incident at the Parchin military facility south of Tehran. Also in May, Israeli and Turkish security agencies foiled an Iranian plot to kidnap Israeli tourists in Turkey. Another plot was foiled in June following a Mossad rescue operation in Istanbul.

On June 12, Argentinian authorities immobilized an Iranian Mahan Air cargo plane that was leased to a Venezuelan state-owned airline. The passports of five Iranian passengers traveling on the plane were confiscated, some of whom were purportedly linked to the IRGC.​ On June 13,​ Mohammad Abdous, an Iranian Air Force scientist from the Aerospace Unit working on several projects, was killed during a mission at a base in northern Iran. The incident occurred less than 24 hours after Ali Kamani, another member of the air force's Aerospace Unit, died in a car accident in the city of Khomein. The New York Times reported that Iranian officials suspect Israel poisoned engineer Ayoob Entezari and geologist Kamran Aghamolaei. On June 14,​ an explosion at a chemical factory in the southern city of Firouzabad injured over 100 Iranian workers, most of them lightly. On June 15, another IRGC officer of the aerospace division,​ Wahab Premarzian, died in​ the city of Maragheh. 
On June 19, an explosion was reported at an IRGC missile base in west Tehran. The site had been targeted last year as well. 
A large cyberattack forced the Iranian state-owned Khuzestan Steel Company to halt production, with two other major steel producers also being targeted. Israeli military correspondents hinted that Israel was responsible for the assault in retaliation for a suspected Iranian cyberattack that caused rocket sirens to be heard in Jerusalem and Eilat the previous week.

In July, IRGC engineer Said Thamardar Mutlak was killed in a suspected Mossad assassination in Shiraz, while Iranian state-media reported that a Mossad-linked spy network planning to carry out "unprecedented acts of sabotage and terrorist operations" in Iran was captured by IRGC intelligence. On August 22, IRGC Brigadier General Abolfazal Alijani was killed in the Aleppo region of Syria. On September 1, an explosion occurred at a key oil refinery in Abadan that supplies 25% of Iran's fuel needs. No injuries were reported. On November 15, an oil tanker owned by an Israeli billionaire was attacked off the coast of Oman by an Iranian drone belonging to the IRGC, causing damage but no injuries. The same day security services in Georgia announced they foiled an Iranian plot to assassinate an Israeli businessman in that country, which was supposed to have been carried out by a Pakistani hit squad hired by Iran and assisted by the IRGC. On November 23, Iran blamed Israel for the death of a senior adviser of the IRGC's aerospace division who was killed by a roadside bomb near Damascus.

Events in 2023
On January 28, a series of bomb-carrying drones attacked an Iranian defense factory in Isfahan, causing material damage at the plant, while a fire broke out at a refinery in the country’s northwest the same day. According to The Wall Street Journal, Israel was responsible for the strike.  Analysts noted that whereas massive anti-Israel demonstrations would have occurred in the past, now the Iranian public seems "indifferent to the intrusions", and that nationalists seemed to have turned against the clerical regime, with sympathy instead for foreign ideas such as basic rights and representative democracy, such as seen in the Mahsa Amini protests.  Protestors chant against public money sent to finance Islamist causes abroad that they don't care about, such as Lebanese Hezbollah, and the regime's failed attempt to set up a "resistance front" in Syria.   The governments muted response seems to reflect a fear of escalation and shame over the Zionists ability to penetrate the Islamist regime's defenses.

On February 17, the IRGC launched a drone attack against an Israeli-owned vessel in the Persian Gulf, causing minor damage.

Iranian supporters and alleged proxies

Syria

Iran and Syria are close strategic allies, and Iran has provided significant support for the Syrian government in the Syrian Civil War, including logistical, technical and financial support, as well as training and some combat troops. Iran sees the survival of the Syrian government as being crucial to its regional interests. The Supreme Leader of Iran, Ali Khamenei, was reported in September 2011 to be vocally in favor of the Syrian government. When the uprising developed into the Syrian Civil War, there were increasing reports of Iranian military support, and of Iranian training of NDF (National Defence Forces) both in Syria and Iran.

Iranian security and intelligence services are advising and assisting the Syrian military in order to preserve Bashar al-Assad's hold on power. Those efforts include training, technical support, and combat troops. Thousands of Iranian operatives – as many as 10,000 by the end of 2013 – have fought in the Syrian civil war on the pro-government side, including regular troops and militia members. In 2018, Tehran said that 2,100 Iranian soldiers have been killed in Syria and Iraq over the past seven years. Iran has also sponsored and facilitated the involvement of Shia militias from across the region to fight in Syria, including Lebanese Hezbollah, Afghan Liwa Fatemiyoun, Pakistani Liwa Zainebiyoun, Iraqi Harakat al-Nujaba, Kataib Seyyed al-Shuhada and Kataib Hezbollah, and Bahraini Saraya Al Mukhtar.

Hezbollah

Hezbollah has grown to an organization with seats in the Lebanese government, a radio and a satellite television-station, programs for social development and large-scale military deployment of fighters beyond Lebanon's borders. The organization has been called a "state within a state". Hezbollah is part of the March 8 Alliance within Lebanon, in opposition to the March 14 Alliance. Hezbollah maintains strong support among Lebanon's Shi'a population, while Sunnis have disagreed with the group's agenda. Following the end of the Israeli occupation of South Lebanon in 2000, its military strength grew significantly, such that its paramilitary wing is considered more powerful than the Lebanese Army. Hezbollah receives military training, weapons, and financial support from Iran, and political support from Syria. Hezbollah also fought against Israel in the 2006 Lebanon War.

Hezbollah has been a major combatant in the Syrian Civil War, helping to ensure the survival of the Iran-backed Assad government. Active support and troop deployment began in 2012, steadily increasing thereafter. Hezbollah deployed several thousand fighters in Syria and by 2015 lost up to 1,500 fighters in combat. Hezbollah has also been very active to prevent rebel penetration from Syria to Lebanon, being one of the most active forces in the Syrian Civil War spillover in Lebanon. By March 2019, 1,677 Lebanese Hezbollah fighters had reportedly been killed in the Syria.

Popular Front for the Liberation of Palestine

Hamas (2005–2011)

Between 2005 and 2011, Iran was one of the main funders and suppliers of Hamas. Israel estimates the Hamas' Brigades have a core of several hundred members, who received military training, including training in Iran and in Syria (before the Syrian Civil War). In 2011, after the outbreak of the Syrian Civil War, Hamas distanced itself from the Syrian government and its members began leaving Syria. Since 2012, Hamas ceased receiving any support from Iran due to Hamas' support of the Muslim Brotherhood in Syria. In a speech for the spokesman of the Qassam brigades in 2014 on Hamas's 27 anniversary he thanked Iran for aid in finance and weapons.

Sudan (2005–2015)

In 2008, Sudan and Iran signed a military cooperation agreement. The agreement was signed by Iran's Defense Minister Mostafa Mohammad-Najjar and his Sudanese counterpart Abdelrahim Mohamed Hussein.

In 2011, however, Sudan reduced its cooperation with Iran after the start of the Syrian Civil War.

In 2015, Sudan completely severed its ties with Iran, by participating in the Saudi-led intervention in the Yemeni Crisis on behalf of the Sunni Arab alliance.

Palestinian Islamic Jihad
Iran is a major financial supporter of the Islamic Jihad Movement in Palestine (PIJ). Following the Israeli and Egyptian squeeze on Hamas in early 2014, PIJ has seen its power steadily increase with the backing of funds from Iran. Its financial backing is believed to also come from Syria.

Popular Mobilization Forces

Israeli supporters and alleged proxies

United States

Israel's closest military ally, the United States, has a long history of violence against Iran, including the August 1953 overthrow of the 
Mossadegh government by U.S. and U.K. covert operatives, and the decades long U.S. support for the authoritarian rule of the Shah.  The U.S. provided major military and other support to Saddam Hussein's Iraq for decades after Iraq attack Iran, and in 1988, the United States launched Operation Praying Mantis against Iran, the largest American naval combat operation since World War II. The United States has military bases that virtually encircle Iran.

U.S. Secretary of State Antony Blinken did not rule out a military intervention to stop Iran from obtaining nuclear weapons.

Saudi Arabia

While Iran is the world's main Shia Muslim-led power, Saudi Arabia sees itself as the leading Sunni Muslim power. In what has been described as a cold war, the Iran–Saudi Arabia proxy conflict, waged on multiple levels over geopolitical, economic, and sectarian influence in pursuit of regional hegemony, has been a major features of western Asia since 1979. American support for Saudi Arabia and its allies as well as Russian and Chinese support for Iran and its allies have drawn comparisons to the dynamics of the Cold War era, and the proxy conflict has been characterized as a front in what Russian Prime Minister Dmitry Medvedev has referred to as the "New Cold War". The rivalry today is primarily a political and economic struggle exacerbated by religious differences, and sectarianism in the region is exploited by both countries for geopolitical purposes as part of the conflict.

Israel and Saudi Arabia do not have any official diplomatic relations. However, news reports have indicated extensive behind-the-scenes diplomatic and intelligence cooperation between the countries, in pursuit of mutual goals against regional enemy Iran.

Azerbaijan

People's Mujahedin of Iran
 In 2012, an NBC news story quoted two unnamed US officials who stated that MEK was financed, trained, and armed by Israel in killing Iranian nuclear scientists. The MEK denied this claim.
 According to a New Yorker report, members of the Mujahideen-e-Khalq received training in the U.S. and Israeli funding for their operations against the Iranian government. The MEK denied this claim.

International responses

Russia

Russian foreign policy in the Middle East during the early 2000s, in light of the Iran–Israel proxy conflict.

After 2001 the government of Vladimir Putin intensified Russia's involvement in the region, supporting Iran's nuclear programs and forgiving Syria 73% of its $13 billion debt.

In his 10 September 2004 article Middle East Horizons of Russian Foreign Politics: Russia returns to one of the world's key regions, Mikhail Margelov, the Head of the Foreign Relations Council of the Russian Federation, wrote:

"President Putin called for the renewal of contacts with the countries with which Russia maintained long friendly relations and invested a lot of material and intellectual resources. The Arab countries constitute a large part of those counties. ... In general, the positions of Russia and the majority of Arab countries on key issues of development of the political situation in the region coincide."

According to March 2007 brief entitled Russia's New Middle Eastern Policy: Back to Bismarck? by Ariel Cohen (Institute for Contemporary Affairs),

"Syria ... was supplying Hizbullah with Russian weapons. In 2006, Israeli forces found evidence of the Russian-made Kornet-E and Metis-M anti-tank systems in Hizbullah's possession in southern Lebanon. The Russian response to accusations that it was supplying terrorist groups with weapons was an announcement, in February 2007, that Russia's military will conduct inspections of Syrian weapons storage facilities with the goal of preventing the weapons from reaching unintended customers. Predictably, such developments placed considerable strain on the already-deteriorating relations between Russia and Israel...

For several years Russia has been attempting to engage in military cooperation with both Israel and Syria. However, the levels of cooperation with the two states are inversely related and an escalation of arms sales to Syria can only damage the relationship with Israel. Russian-Syrian military cooperation has gone through numerous stages: high levels of cooperation during the Soviet era, which was virtually halted until 2005, and now Russia's attempt to balance its relationship with both Israel and Syria. However, Russia's recent eastward leanings might indicate that Moscow is prepared to enter a new stage in its military cooperation with Syria, even if this is to the detriment of its relationship with Israel.

Israel–Russia relations improved after the Russian military intervention in Syria in September 2015. From then until July 2018, Israeli Prime Minister Benjamin Netanyahu and Putin met a total of 9 times. Prior to and immediately after the 2016 United States presidential election, Israel began lobbying the United States to strike a deal with Russia over restricting the Iranian military presence in Syria in exchange for removing U.S. sanctions against Russia.

In 2019, Russia rejected an Iranian request to buy  S-400 missile defense system. Ruslan Pukhov, head of the Center of Analysis of Strategies and Technologies in Moscow, said: "If Russia decides to provide Iran with S-400, it will be a direct challenge to Saudi Arabia and Israel, so it will be against Russia's own national interests."

See also
 2021 Natanz incident
 Arab Cold War
 Arab–Israeli conflict
 Axis of Resistance
 Iran–Israel conflict during the Syrian civil war
 Iran–Israel relations
 Iran–Saudi Arabia proxy conflict
 Israeli–Lebanese conflict
 List of modern conflicts in the Middle East
 Russia–Syria–Iran–Iraq coalition
 Second Cold War
 Hybrid warfare against Iran

References

 
Proxy conflict
 
Geopolitical rivalry
Proxy wars
1980s conflicts
Conflicts in 1985
1985 in Israel
1985 in Iran
1980s in Israel
1980s in Iran
1990s conflicts
1990s in Israel
1990s in Iran
2000s conflicts
2000s in Israel
2000s in Iran
2010s conflicts
2010s in Israel
2010s in Iran
2020s conflicts
2020s in Israel
2020s in Iran
Foreign involvement in the Syrian civil war
Conflicts involving the People's Mojahedin Organization of Iran
Iran–Saudi Arabia proxy conflict
Wars involving Iran
Wars involving Israel